Jack Steadman (born 1989 or 1990), also known by his stage name Mr Jukes (stylised in lowercase), is an English singer-songwriter, musician, and record producer best known as the vocalist and primary songwriter of the indie rock band Bombay Bicycle Club since its formation in 2005. He released his debut album as Mr Jukes, God First, in 2017.

Background
Bombay Bicycle Club announced a hiatus in January 2016 as the band members had decided to pursue their own individual projects. Steadman had embarked on a round-the-world trip without flying and recording his solo album.  In Shanghai, Steadman boarded a cargo ship and set up a studio in his cabin and began writing his solo album.

The name Mr Jukes comes from a character in Joseph Conrad's Typhoon named Jukes, who was second in command on a ship heading into a typhoon. Steadman read the book while he was travelling on the cargo ship. The opening song of Mr Jukes' debut album is titled after the same novella.

God First
Mr Jukes debut album God First was released 14 July 2017. Steadman drew inspiration from jazz, soul and funk to write the album, which features several collaborations. The album features collaborations with Lianne La Havas, Charles Bradley, De La Soul, Horace Andy, Lalah Hathaway, BJ the Chicago Kid and more.

The Locket with Barney Artist 
In the Summer of 2021 the collaborative project The Locket recorded by Steadman and Barney Artist was released. The London-based artist Barney Artist also contributed to God First's track From Golden Stars Comes Silver Dew” (with Lalah Hathaway). The Locket features 10 tracks cut from sessions that span over 18 months with its title track referring to memories of happier times: we fill a locket with memories we protect, and don’t forget to keep it round your neck. The record features two guest artists - Lex Amor in the sixth track Autumn Leaves and Kofi Stone in the eighth piece, titled Check The Pulse.

Discography

References

External links

Island Records artists
20th-century births
Living people
British musicians
Year of birth missing (living people)